i-MSCP (internet Multi Server Control Panel) is a software (OSS) for shared hosting environments management on Linux servers. It comes with a large choice of modules for various services such as Apache2, ProFTPd, Dovecot, Courier, Bind9, and can be easily extended through plugins, or listener files using its events-based API.

Latest stable is the 1.5.3 version (build 2018120800) which has been released on 8 December 2018.

Key people
 Laurent Declercq (France) - CEO, Lead Developer
 Glenn B. Jakobsen (Sweden) - Logistic, hoster (Kazi Network)

Licensing 
i-MSCP has a dual license. A part of the base code is licensed under the Mozilla Public License. All new code, and submissions to i-MSCP are licensed under the GNU LESSER GENERAL PUBLIC LICENSE Version 2.1 (LGPLv2). To solve this license conflict there is work on a complete rewrite for a completely LGPLv2 licensed i-MSCP.

Features

Supported Linux Distributions 
 Debian ≥ Jessie (8.0)
 Devuan ≥ Jessie (1.0)
 Ubuntu Any LTS version ≥ Trusty Thar (14.04 LTS)

Supported Daemons / Services 
 Web server: Apache (ITK, Fcgid and FastCGI/PHP-FPM), Nginx
 Name server: Bind9
 MTA (Mail Transport Agent): Postfix
 MDA (Mail Delivery Agent): Courier, Dovecot
 Database: MySQL, MariaDB, Percona
 FTP-Server: ProFTPD, vsftpd
 Web statistics: AWStats

Addons 
 PhpMyAdmin
 Pydio, formerly AjaXplorer
 Net2ftp
 Roundcube
 Rainloop

Plugins 
See i-MSCP plugin store

Competing software 
 cPanel
 DTC
 Froxlor
 ISPConfig
 ispCP
 Plesk
 SysCP
 Virtualmin

External links 
 

Linux software
Web applications
Website management
User interfaces
Web hosting
Web server management software